Wilmer López Arguedas (born 3 August 1971) is a retired Costa Rican footballer.

He played for Alajuelense and is one of the club's biggest idols of all time.

Club career
López made his debut in the Costa Rican Primera División on 5 January 1992 playing with Carmelita against ASODELI also scoring his first league goal in that match. The following next season, he was bought by Alajuelense, becoming one of the most beloved players and a crowd favorite, playing 13 seasons and winning 7 Costa Rican Championships, 3 Copa Interclubes UNCAF championships and 1 CONCACAF Champions' Cup, being part of the team that won 4 national championships in a row (1999–2000–2002–2003). He was named the best player of the national tournament for two seasons in a row before moving to Deportes Tolima in Colombia, whom he left very soon due to contractual problems, and again during another season, when he returned to Costa Rica. He also played the Copa Merconorte and the Copa Sudamericana.

Nicknamed El Pato (The Duck),  the midfielder also played for Pérez Zeledón. He is also known as El Ingeniero (The Engineer) due to his amazing ability to create plays with short and long passes and also for his fast thinking that made him one of the best midfielders in the region during the '90s and the early 2000s. After 2003, he suffered multiple injuries that made him lose a lot of games and he never regained his earlier abilities as a player, although he was still loved by the crowd and gave a few good games along the road to the end of the 2007 season when his contract expired and the team decided not to hire him again. It was a very sad day for all the Alajuelense's fans. Every time Pérez Zeledón played at the Alejandro Morera Soto stadium, his former fans waited for him singing and clapping every time he touched the ball, letting him know he still was in their hearts. López totalled 478 league matches and 80 goals for Liga. He also played 92 international club games for them. He played 550 league games in total.

International career
López made his debut for Costa Rica in an August 1995 friendly match against Japan and earned a total of 76 caps, scoring 6 goals. He represented his country in 22 FIFA World Cup qualification matches and played in all 3 games during the 2002 FIFA World Cup held in Korea and Japan. He also played at the 1995 and 1997 UNCAF Nations Cups as well as at the 1998, 2000, 2002 and 2003 CONCACAF Gold Cups and the 1997 Copa América. He also was a non-playing squad member at the 2001 Copa América.

His final international was a July 2003 CONCACAF Gold Cup match against the United States.

International goals
Scores and results list Costa Rica's goal tally first.

Retirement
On Wednesday 22 July 2009, López played his retirement match with Alajuelense against a team of friends that he picked himself. He played the first half with his friends and the second half with Alajuelense to finish the match defending the colors that he loves.

"El Pato" was one of the most loved players in Alajuelense, along with his devotion to "La 12", the official group of Fans. They became more notorious on the day of his retirement, when all the fans jumped into the field to carry him on their shoulders for almost an hour.

Personal life
López is married to Alejandra López and the couple has two sons and a daughter. For a brief period in 2014, her daughter dated the Costa Rican celebrity Andrés Nando Sibaja.

References

External links
 
 Perfil de jugadores de la Selección Nacional Wílmer López - Nación 

1971 births
Living people
People from Alajuela
Association football midfielders
Costa Rican footballers
Costa Rica international footballers
1997 Copa América players
1998 CONCACAF Gold Cup players
2000 CONCACAF Gold Cup players
2001 Copa América players
2002 CONCACAF Gold Cup players
2002 FIFA World Cup players
2003 CONCACAF Gold Cup players
A.D. Carmelita footballers
L.D. Alajuelense footballers
Deportes Tolima footballers
Costa Rican expatriate footballers
Expatriate footballers in Colombia
Copa Centroamericana-winning players
Costa Rican football managers
Liga FPD players